

Osmund or Oswynus (died between 805 and 811) was a medieval Bishop of London.

Osmund was consecrated between 801 and 803 and died between 805 and 811.

Citations

References

External links
 

Bishops of London
800s deaths
Year of birth unknown
9th-century English bishops